Aleixandre is a surname. Notable people with the surname include:

Concepción Aleixandre (1862–1952), Spanish scientist, inventor, and writer
Marilar Aleixandre (born 1947), Spanish writer, translator, and biologist
Vicente Aleixandre (1898–1984), Spanish poet

See also
Alexandre (surname)